Neil Gordon Kinnock, Baron Kinnock  (born 28 March 1942) is a British former politician who served as Leader of the Opposition and Leader of the Labour Party from 1983 to 1992. He served as a Member of Parliament (MP) from 1970 until 1995, first for Bedwellty and then for Islwyn. He was Vice-President of the European Commission from 1999 to 2004. Kinnock was considered as being on the soft left of the Labour Party.

Born and raised in South Wales, Kinnock was first elected to the House of Commons in the 1970 general election. He became the Labour Party’s shadow education minister after the Conservatives won power in the 1979 general election. After the party under Michael Foot suffered a landslide defeat to Margaret Thatcher in the 1983 election, Kinnock was elected Leader of the Labour Party and Leader of the Opposition. During his tenure as leader, Kinnock proceeded to fight the party's left wing, especially Militant tendency, and he opposed NUM leader Arthur Scargill's methods in the 1984–85 miners' strike. He led the party during most of the Thatcher administration, which included its third successive election defeat when Thatcher won the 1987 general election. Although Thatcher had won another landslide, Labour regained sufficient seats for Kinnock to remain Leader of the Opposition following the election.

Kinnock led the Labour Party to a surprise fourth consecutive defeat at the 1992 general election, despite the party being ahead of John Major’s Conservative government in most opinion polls, which had predicted either a narrow Labour victory or a hung parliament. Shortly afterwards, he resigned as Leader of the Labour Party, being succeeded in the ensuing leadership election by John Smith. He left the House of Commons in 1995 to become a European Commissioner. He went on to become the Vice-President of the European Commission under Romano Prodi from 1999–2004, before being elevated to the House of Lords as Baron Kinnock in 2005. Until the summer of 2009, he was also Chairman of the British Council and President of Cardiff University.

Early life
Kinnock, an only child, was born in Tredegar, Wales. His father, Gordon Herbert Kinnock was a former coal miner who later worked as a labourer; and his mother Mary Kinnock (née Howells) was a district nurse. Gordon died of a heart attack in November 1971 aged 64; Mary died the following month aged 61.

In 1953, at eleven years old, Kinnock began his secondary education at Lewis School, Pengam, which he later criticised for its record on caning. He went on to the University College of South Wales and Monmouthshire in Cardiff (now Cardiff University), where he graduated in 1965 with a degree in Industrial Relations and History. The following year, Kinnock obtained a postgraduate diploma in education. Between August 1966 and May 1970, he worked as a tutor for a Workers' Educational Association (WEA).

He has been married to Glenys Kinnock since 1967. They have two children – son Stephen Kinnock (born January 1970, now a Labour MP), and daughter Rachel Kinnock (born 1971).

Member of Parliament
In June 1969, he won the Labour Party nomination for Bedwellty in South Wales, which became Islwyn for the 1983 general election. He was first elected to the House of Commons on 18 June 1970, and became a member of the National Executive Committee of the Labour Party in October 1978. Upon his becoming an MP, his father said "Remember Neil, MP stands not just for Member of Parliament, but also for Man of Principle."

In the 1975 referendum on Britain's membership of the European Communities, Kinnock campaigned for Britain to leave the Common Market.

Following Labour's defeat at the 1979 general election, James Callaghan appointed Kinnock to the Shadow cabinet as education spokesman. His ambition was noted by other MPs, and David Owen's opposition to the changes to the electoral college was thought to be motivated by the realisation that they would favour Kinnock's succession. Kinnock remained as education spokesman following the resignation of Callaghan as Leader of the Labour Party and the election of Michael Foot as his successor in late 1980.

In 1981, while still serving as Labour's education spokesman, Kinnock was alleged to have effectively scuppered Tony Benn's attempt to replace Denis Healey as Labour's Deputy Leader by first supporting the candidacy of the more traditionalist Tribunite John Silkin and then urging Silkin supporters to abstain on the second, run-off, ballot.

Kinnock was known as a left-winger, and gained prominence for his attacks on Margaret Thatcher's handling of the Falklands War in 1982, although it was in fact this conflict which saw support for the Conservative government increase, and contribute to its landslide re-election the following year.

Leadership of the Labour Party

First period (1983–1987)

Following Labour's landslide defeat at the 1983 general election, Michael Foot resigned as Leader of the Labour Party aged 69, and from the outset; it was expected that the much younger Kinnock would succeed him. He was finally elected as Labour Party leader on 2 October 1983, with 71% of the vote, and Roy Hattersley was elected as his deputy; their prospective partnership was considered to be a "dream ticket".

His first period as party leader between the 1983 and 1987 general elections was dominated by his struggle with the hard-left Militant tendency, then still a dominant force in the party. Kinnock was determined to move the party's political standing to a centrist position, in order to improve its chances of winning a future general election. Although Kinnock had come from the Tribune left-wing of the party, he parted company with many of his former allies following his appointment to the Shadow Cabinet.

The Labour Party was also threatened by the rise of the Social Democratic Party/Liberal Alliance, which pulled out more centrist adherents. On a broader perspective, the traditional Labour voter was disappearing in the face of de-industrialisation that the Conservative government had accepted since 1979. Kinnock focused on modernising the party, and upgrading its technical skills such as use of the media and keeping track of voters, while at the same time battling the Militants. Under his leadership, the Labour Party abandoned unpopular old positions, especially the nationalisation of certain industries, although this process was not completed until future party leader Tony Blair revamped Clause IV in the party's manifesto in 1995. He stressed economic growth, which had a much broader appeal to the middle-class than the idea of redistributing wealth to benefit the poor. He accepted membership in the European Economic Community, whereas the party had pledged immediate withdrawal from it under Michael Foot. He discarded the rhetoric of class warfare.

All this meant that Kinnock had made plenty of enemies on the left-wing of the party by the time he was elected as leader, though a substantial number of former Bennites gave him strong support. He was almost immediately in serious difficulty as a result of Arthur Scargill's decision to lead his union, the National Union of Mineworkers (NUM) into a national strike (in opposition to pit closures) without a nationwide ballot. The NUM was widely regarded as the labour movement's praetorian guard and the strike convulsed the Labour movement. Kinnock supported the aim of the strike – which he dubbed the "case for coal" – but, as an MP from a mining area, was bitterly critical of the tactics employed. When heckled at a Labour Party rally for referring to the killing of David Wilkie as "an outrage", Kinnock lost his temper and accused the hecklers of "living like parasites off the struggle of the miners" and implied that Scargill had lied to the striking miners. In 1985, he made his criticisms public in a speech to Labour's conference:
In 2004, Kinnock said of Scargill, "Oh I detest him. I did then, I do now, and it's mutual. He hates me as well. And I'd much prefer to have his savage hatred than even the merest hint of friendship from that man."

The strike's defeat early in the year, and the bad publicity associated with the entryism practised by the Trotskyist Militant group were the immediate context for the 1985 Labour Party conference. Earlier in the year, left-wing councils had protested at Government restriction of their budgets by refusing to set budgets, resulting in a budget crisis in the Militant-dominated Liverpool City Council. Kinnock attacked Militant and their conduct in a speech delivered at the conference:

One Liverpool MP, Eric Heffer, a member of the NEC left the conference stage in disgust at Kinnock's comments. In June 1986, the Labour Party finally expelled the deputy leader of Liverpool council, the high-profile Militant supporter Derek Hatton, who was found guilty of "manipulating the rules of the district Labour party". By 1986, the party's position appeared to strengthen further with excellent local election results and a thorough rebranding of the party under the direction of Kinnock's director of communications Peter Mandelson, as well as seizing the Fulham seat in West London from the Conservatives at an April by-election. Labour, now sporting a continental social democratic style emblem of a rose (replacing the party's first logo, the Liberty logo), appeared to be able to run the governing Conservatives close, but Margaret Thatcher did not let Labour's makeover go unchallenged.

The Conservatives' 1986 conference was well-managed, and effectively relaunched the Conservatives as a party of radical free-market economic liberalism. Labour suffered from a persistent image of extremism, especially as Kinnock's campaign to root out Militant dragged on as figures on the hard left of the party tried to stop its progress. Opinion polls showed that voters favoured retaining the United Kingdom's nuclear weapons, (Labour's policy, supported by Kinnock, was of unilateral nuclear disarmament), and believed that the Conservatives would be better than Labour at defending the country.

1987 general election
In early 1987, Labour lost a by-election in Greenwich to the SDP's Rosie Barnes. As a result, Labour faced the 1987 general election in some danger of finishing third in the popular vote, with the Conservatives once again expected to secure a comfortable victory. In secret, Labour's aim was to secure second place in order to remain as Official Opposition.

Mandelson and his team had revolutionised Labour's communications – a transformation symbolised by a party election broadcast popularly known as "Kinnock: The Movie". This was directed by Hugh Hudson and featured Kinnock's 1985 conference speech, and shots of him and his wife Glenys walking on the Great Orme in Llandudno (so emphasising his appeal as a family man and associating him with images of Wales away from the coal mining communities where he grew up), and a speech to that year's Welsh Labour Party conference asking why he was the "first Kinnock in a thousand generations" to go to university.

On polling day, Labour easily took second place, but with only a 31% share of the vote to the SDP-Liberal Alliance's 22%. Labour was still more than ten percentage points behind the Conservatives, who retained a three-figure majority in the House of Commons. However, the Conservative government's majority had come down from 144 seats in 1983 to 102. Significantly, Labour had gained twenty seats at the election.

Labour won extra seats in Scotland, Wales and Northern England, but lost ground particularly in Southern England and London, where the Conservatives still dominated. The Conservatives also regained the Fulham seat which it had lost to Labour at a by-election just over a year earlier.

Second period (1987–1992)

A few months after the general election, Kinnock gained brief attention in the United States in August 1987 when it was discovered that then-US Senator Joe Biden of Delaware (and future 46th President) plagiarised one of Kinnock's speeches during his 1988 presidential campaign in a speech at a Democratic Party debate in Iowa. This led to Biden's withdrawal of his presidential campaign. The two men met after the incident, forming a lasting friendship.

The second period of Kinnock's leadership was dominated by his drive to reform the party's policies to gain office. This began with an exercise dubbed the policy review, the most high-profile aspect of which was a series of consultations with the public known as "Labour Listens" in the autumn of 1987.

Following Labour Listens, the party went on, in 1988, to produce a new statement of aims and values—meant to supplement and supplant the formulation of Clause IV of the party's constitution (though, crucially, this was not actually replaced until 1995 under the leadership of Tony Blair) and was closely modelled on Anthony Crosland's social-democratic thinking—emphasising equality rather than public ownership. At the same time, the Labour Party's commitment to unilateral nuclear disarmament was dropped, and reforms of Party Conference and the National Executive meant that local parties lost much of their ability to influence policy.

In 1988, Kinnock was challenged by Tony Benn for the party leadership. Later many identified this as a particularly low period in Kinnock's leadership — as he appeared mired in internal battles after five years of leadership with the Conservatives still dominating the scene, and being ahead in the opinion polls. In the end, though, Kinnock won a decisive victory over Benn and would soon enjoy a substantial rise in support.

The policy review — reporting in 1989 —coincided with Labour's move ahead in the polls as the poll tax row was destroying Conservative support, and Labour won big victories in local council elections as well as several parliamentary by-elections during 1989 and 1990. Labour overtook the Conservatives at the 1989 European elections, winning 40% of the vote; the first time Labour had finished in first place at a national election in fifteen years.

In December 1989, Kinnock abandoned the Labour policy on closed shops—a decision seen by many as a move away from traditional socialist policies to a more European-wide agenda, and also a move to rid the party of its image of being run by trade unions.

Michael Heseltine challenged Thatcher's leadership and she resigned on 28 November 1990 to be succeeded by then-Chancellor of the Exchequer, John Major. Kinnock greeted Thatcher's resignation by describing it as "very good news" and demanded an immediate general election.

Public reaction to Major's elevation was highly positive. A new Prime Minister and the fact that Kinnock was now the longest-serving current leader of a major party reduced the impact of calls for "Time for a Change". Neil Kinnock's showing in the opinion polls dipped; before Thatcher's resignation, Labour had been up to 10 points ahead of the Conservatives in the opinion polls (an Ipsos MORI poll in April 1990 had actually shown Labour as being more than 20 points ahead of the Conservatives), but many opinion polls were actually showing the Conservatives with a higher amount of support than Labour, in spite of the deepening recession.

By now Militant had finally been routed in the party, and their two MPs were expelled at the end of 1991, in addition to a number of supporters. The majority in the group were now disenchanted with entryism, and chose to function outside Labour's ranks, forming the Socialist Party.

1992 general election

In the three years leading up to the 1992 general election, Labour had consistently topped the opinion polls, with 1991 seeing the Conservatives (rejuvenated by the arrival of a new leader with John Major the previous November) snatch the lead from Labour more than once before Labour regained it. The rise in Conservative support came in spite of the economic recession and sharp rise in unemployment which affected Britain in 1991. Since Major's election as Leader of the Conservative Party (and becoming Prime Minister), Kinnock had spent the end of 1990 and most of 1991 putting pressure on Major to call a general election that year, but Major had held out and by the autumn he had insisted that there would be no general election in 1991.

Labour had gained four seats from the Conservatives in by-elections since the 1987 general election, having initially suffered disappointing results in some by-elections, namely a loss of the Govan constituency in Glasgow to the Scottish National Party in November 1988. However, by the end of 1991, the Conservative majority still stood at 88 seats and Labour needed to win more than ninety new seats to gain an overall majority, although there was still the hope of forming a minority or coalition government if Labour failed to win a majority. In the run-up to the election, held on 9 April 1992, most opinion polls had suggested that the election would result in either a hung parliament or a small Labour majority.

At the 1992 general election, Labour made considerable progress – reducing the Conservatives' majority to just 21 seats. It came as a shock to many when the Conservatives won a majority, but the 'triumphalism' perceived by some observers of a Labour Party rally in Sheffield (together with Kinnock's performance on the podium) may have helped put floating voters off. Although internal polls suggested no impact, while public polls suggested a decline in support had already occurred, most of those directly involved in the campaign believe that the rally only came to widespread attention after the electoral defeat itself, with Kinnock himself changing his mind to a rejection of its negative impact over time. In an essay exploring why Kinnock never became Prime Minister, Steve Richards notes that the impact of the rally on the 1992 election "acquired a mythological status as fatal event" after Labour's defeat. He further argues that this explanation is "a red herring" and that the same result would have happened without the rally.

On the day of the general election, The Sun newspaper ran a front page featuring Kinnock with the headline 'If Kinnock wins today, will the last person to leave Britain please turn out the lights.' In his resignation speech, Kinnock blamed The Sun for Labour losing the election, along with other right-wing media sections who had backed the Conservatives in the run-up to the election. The following day's headline in The Sun was 'It's The Sun Wot Won It', which Rupert Murdoch - many years later, at his April 2012 appearance before the Leveson Inquiry - stated was both 'tasteless and wrong' and led to the editor Kelvin MacKenzie receiving a reprimand.

The Labour-supporting Daily Mirror had backed Kinnock for the 1987 general election and did so again in 1992. Less expected was the Financial Times backing Kinnock at the 1992 general election.

Kinnock himself later claimed to have half-expected his defeat at the 1992 general election and proceeded to turn himself into a media personality, hosting a chat show on BBC Wales and twice appearing on the topical panel show Have I Got News for You within a year of the defeat. Many years later, he returned to appear as a guest host of the programme.

Post-parliamentary career
Kinnock announced his resignation as Leader of the Labour Party on 13 April 1992, ending nearly a decade in the role. John Smith, previously Shadow Chancellor, was elected on 18 July as his successor.

He remains on the Advisory Council of the Institute for Public Policy Research, which he helped set up in the 1980s.

Kinnock was an enthusiastic supporter of Ed Miliband's campaign for the Leadership of the Labour Party in 2010, and was reported as telling activists, when Miliband won, "We've got our party back" – although Miliband, like Kinnock, failed to lead the party back into government, and resigned after the Conservatives were re-elected with a small majority in 2015. Labour received their lowest seat tally under Miliband since the 1987 general election; when Kinnock was leader at that time.  

In 2011, he participated in the Welsh family history television programme Coming Home where he discovered hitherto unknown information about his family.

European Union Commissioner

Kinnock was appointed one of the UK's two members of the European Commission, which he served first as Transport Commissioner under President Jacques Santer, in early-1995; marking the end of his 25 years in the House of Commons. This came less than a year following the death of his successor, John Smith and the election of Tony Blair as the party's new leader.

He was obliged to resign as part of the forced, collective resignation of the Commission in 1999. He was re-appointed to the Commission under new President Romano Prodi. He now became one of the Vice-Presidents of the European Commission, with responsibility for Administrative Reform and the Audit, Linguistics and Logistics Directorates General. His term of office as a Commissioner was due to expire on 30 October 2004, but was delayed owing to the withdrawal of the new Commissioners. During this second term of office on the Commission, he was responsible for introducing new staff regulations for EU officials, a significant feature of which was substantial salary cuts for everyone employed after 1 May 2004, reduced pension prospects for many others, and gradually worsening employment conditions. This made him disliked by many EU staff members, although the pressure on budgets that largely drove these changes had actually been imposed on the Commission from above by the Member States in Council.

In February 2004, it was announced that with effect from 1 November 2004, Kinnock would become head of the British Council. Coincidentally, at the same time, his son Stephen became head of the British Council branch in St. Petersburg, Russia. At the end of October, it was announced that he would become a Member of the House of Lords (intending to be a working peer), when he was able to leave his EU responsibilities. In 1977, he had remained in the House of Commons, with Dennis Skinner, while other MPs walked to the Lords to hear the Queen's speech opening the new parliament. He had dismissed going to the Lords in recent interviews. Kinnock explained his change of attitude, despite the continuing presence of ninety hereditary peers and appointment by patronage, by asserting that the Lords was a good base for campaigning.

Life peerage

He was introduced to the House of Lords on 31 January 2005, after being created, on 28 January, Baron Kinnock, of Bedwellty in the County of Gwent. On assuming his seat, he stated; "I accepted the kind invitation to enter the House of Lords as a working peer for practical political reasons." When his peerage was first announced, he said, "It will give me the opportunity... to contribute to the national debate on issues like higher education, research, Europe and foreign policy."

His peerage meant that the Labour and Conservative parties were equal in numbers in the upper house of Parliament (subsequently the number of Labour members overtook the number of Conservative members for many years). Kinnock was a long-time critic of the House of Lords, and his acceptance of a peerage led him to be accused of hypocrisy, by Will Self, among others.

Views

Welsh identity and devolution
In the build up to the 1979 Welsh devolution referendum, the Labour government was in favour of devolution for Wales. Kinnock was one of just six MPs in South Wales who campaigned against devolution, and personally backed an amendment to the Wales Act stating that devolution would require not only a simple majority, but also the backing of 40% of the entire electorate. He later clarified that he supports devolution in principle, but found the proposed settlement at the time as failing to address the economic disparities in the UK, particularly following the closure of coal mines in Wales

Kinnock has often referred to himself as a "unionist" and has stated that "between the mid-sixteenth century and the mid-eighteenth century Wales had practically no history at all, and even before that it was the history of rural brigands who have been ennobled by being called princes".

Brexit
Lord Kinnock strongly opposed Brexit. In 2018, Kinnock stated, “The truth is that we can either take the increasingly plain risks and costs of leaving the EU or have the stability, growth and revenues vital for crucial public services like the NHS and social care. Recognising that, we should stop Brexit to save the NHS – or, at very least, mitigate the damage by seeking European Economic Area membership.”

Personal life
Kinnock met Glenys Kinnock (née Parry) in the early 1960s whilst studying at University College, Cardiff, where they were known as "the power and the glory" (Glenys being the power), and they married on 25 March 1967. His wife was the UK's Minister for Africa and the United Nations from 2009–2010, and a Labour Member of the European Parliament (MEP) from 1994–2009. When she was made a life peer in 2009, they became one of the few couples both to hold titles in their own right.  Previously living together in Peterston-super-Ely, a village near the western outskirts of Cardiff, in 2008 they relocated to Tufnell Park, London, to be closer to their daughter and grandchildren.

They have a son, Stephen and a daughter, Rachel.  Neil Kinnock, through his son Stephen, is also the father-in-law of Helle Thorning-Schmidt who was Prime Minister of Denmark from 2011 to 2015.

On 26 April 2006, Kinnock was given a six-month driving ban after being found guilty of two speeding offences along the M4 motorway, west of London.

Lord Kinnock is a Cardiff City F.C. fan and regularly attends matches. He is also a follower of rugby union and supports London Welsh RFC at club level, regularly attending Wales games.

He was portrayed by both Chris Barrie and Steve Coogan in the satirical TV programme Spitting Image, and by Euan Cuthbertson in the Scottish film In Search of La Che.

In 2014, Lord Kinnock was painted by artist Edward Sutcliffe. The portrait was exhibited at the Royal Society of Portrait Painters Annual Exhibition that year.

Kinnock has been described as an agnostic and an atheist. Like his wife, he is a Patron of Humanists UK.

See also

References

Further reading
 
 Peter Kellner, essay on Neil Kinnock in G. Rosen (ed.), Dictionary of Labour Biography, Politicos Publishing, 2001; 
 George Drower, Neil Kinnock: The Path to Leadership, Weidenfeld & Nicolson, 1984
 Greg Rosen, Old Labour to New, Politicos Publishing, 2005 (an account of the Labour Party before, during and after the Kinnock years); 
 Martin Westlake and Ian St. John, Kinnock, Little Brown Book Group Limited, 2001; 
 Patrick Wintour and Colin Hughes, Labour Rebuilt, Fourth Estate, 1990 (an account of Kinnock's modernisation of the Labour Party)

External links

 
 
 Neil Kinnock on the Home Secretary’s ambitions, and Cameron
 
 
 Neil Kinnock-2010 Interview
 Announcement of his introduction at the House of Lords  House of Lords minutes of proceedings, 31 January 2005
 
The Papers of Neil Kinnock held at Churchill Archives Centre

|-

|-

 
 

|-
 
 

|-

|-

 

|-

|-

 
 

|-
 
 

 
1942 births
Alumni of Cardiff University
British European Commissioners
Chairs of the Labour Party (UK)
Neil
European democratic socialists
Labour Party (UK) life peers
Leaders of the Labour Party (UK)
Leaders of the Opposition (United Kingdom)
Living people
Welsh Labour Party MPs
Members of the Privy Council of the United Kingdom
People associated with Cardiff University
People educated at Lewis School, Pengam
People from Tredegar
Secular humanists
Spouses of life peers
UK MPs 1970–1974
UK MPs 1974
UK MPs 1974–1979
UK MPs 1979–1983
UK MPs 1983–1987
UK MPs 1987–1992
UK MPs 1992–1997
Welsh agnostics
Welsh humanists
Welsh people of Scottish descent
Welsh socialists
European Commissioners 1995–1999
European Commissioners 1999–2004
People of the British Council
Life peers created by Elizabeth II